Doxa Drama Football Club is a Greek professional football club based in the city of Drama, Macedonia, Greece. The club currently competes in the Super League 2, the second tier of the Greek football league system. Founded in 1918, the club's home ground since then has been Doxa Drama Stadium.

Doxa Drama is considered one of the most historic and major teams of Greece, and was one of the founding members of the Super League, the first tier of Greek football.

History
During World War I, near the city of Drama, Macedonia, a team of English soldiers who played football regularly in their camp inspired the local Greek population to create the first football club in the region. Founded as Peleus in 1918, the team was renamed Doxa (Glory) in 1919.

Initially, the team colors were black and white with the logo of a black clover. After the war, the team's logo was permanently changed to a black eagle, while the team colours of black and white remain until today.

The first formal match of Doxa was against AO Kavala, the team of neighbouring city Kavala. In that first game Doxa lost 3–0. Doxa Drama is one of the founders of the Greek League Alpha Ethniki, the highest tier of Greek club football. Doxa reached the final of the Greek football Cup in 1953–54, 1957–58 and 1958–59, but lost all three finals from Olympiacos.

Doxa Drama participated in Alpha Ethniki for 21 seasons. Financial and administrative turmoil, however, led to the club being relegated to Greece's amateur division, Delta Ethniki. In 2008–09, Doxa had a strong year in the Third Division and clinched the Gamma Ethniki North title with two games to spare. Doxa returned to Beta Ethniki after 11 years for the 2009–10 season, where the team finished 14th in the regular season and 13th after the Beta Ethniki play-outs.

Financial problems continued for Doxa Drama that was never able to return to Alpha Ethniki (Nowadays named Super League). In season 2018–19, it plays in the Greek Football League (2nd level of Greek Football).

In February 2019, a group of Russian, Lithuanian investors based in Delaware purchased 15% of the team (Minority stake).

Stadium
Doxa Drama's stadium is a multipurpose stadium used primarily for football matches in Drama. It is the physical seat of Doxa Drama with a capacity of 10,000  spectators.
In their early years, the club was trying to find a place to be able to have a stable seat. They did it in 1953, when Athanasios Doubesis, with his official donation, gave an area to build the stadium. After World War II, and after rebuilding the stadium, it was originally only the western platform. In the 80's, the northern part of the stadium was built, while the same decade attempted to build the left-hand side, which did not start, but was completed in 2011, when the works on the stadium were over.

Crest and colours

Crest
The primary crest of the club was the clover. Each leaf of the clover was written a letter from the GSD (initially the words "Gymnastic Association of Drama"). The crest changed at the 1950s after many fans' reactions, removing the preference of black clover and putting the black eagle in its position, which the team has even today. But, searching today in the club's archives, no one can find any official document that certifies when and why the crest was changed. After some research and conversation with old footballers of Doxa Drama's Golden Age, discovered that this change was gradually and unofficially as a natural result of the publications of the time, as veteran Vangelis Simpliotis mentions.

Colours
The colours of the club are black and white. The black clothing honors those Doxa Drama's footballers who were killed during the Greek-Bulgarian War. Doxa's legend Takis Loukanidis had said:

Support
The famous and revered association of Doxa's fans, from which devotion and worship originates to the entity of the group and each player separately for 93 years now, consists not only of the Door 4 fanatics who for so many years do something more for Doxa Drama, but also by team members. People reluctant to forget and at the same time willingly to help, either financially or spiritually, by maintaining their love for the club of their hearts and if they can spread it to the younger generations.
But the real test for friends and fanatics came when they had to keep their love unchanged during the great decadence of Doxa Dramas. When Doxa fell to the Fourth National Division (Delta Ethniki), things showed that the fans' loyalty had completely faded after the under-operation of the league that led to its closure, which made the situation in the team hopeless and hopeless to revive it. Eventually, in the case of Doxa, the saying "the phenomena abort" applied, as the team and the fans needed a "click" to wake up from the lethargy to which they had fallen for a long time.
In 2004, in the wake of the Athens Olympic Games, a group of people managed to re-establish the fans' association of Doxa. They then voted for president and in the following year the list of members of the association was "fired". Eligible friends of the group, who may have left but did not forget, were re-establishing the association, which was for them a redemption, and by extension the club. The association to this day is trying to give the Friends of Doxa their old glory, when the Dramians did not fare with the parties, but they talked until Thursday about the last fight and from Friday to the next. This is one of the many factors that the Friends of Doxa Dramas are rated as the three most fanatical provincial group fans.
The fans also managed to persuade their executives at the 50s to change the club's logo, the previously black clover, to the black eagle known to all of us today.

Players

Current squad

Personnel

Ownership and current board

|}

Coaching and medical staff

Coaching staff

Medical staff

Notable managers

 Kostas Vasilakakis (1981–95)
 Michalis Grigoriou
 Apostolos Charalampidis
 Makis Katsavakis

Notable players

 Georgios Georgiadis
 Takis Loukanidis
 Theodoros Pahatouridis
 Kyriakos Tohouroglou

Honours

Domestic

Leagues
Football League (Second Division)
 Winners (3): 1962–63, 1978–79, 1987–88
Gamma Ethniki (Third Division)
 Winners (1): 2008–09
Delta Ethniki (Fourth Division)
 Winners (1): 2002–03

Cups
Greek Football Cup
 Runners-Up (3): 1953-54, 1957-58, 1958-59

Bibliography
 «ΔΟΞΑ ΔΡΑΜΑΣ 1918–1965 ΛΕΥΚΩΜΑ», Βασίλης Τσιαμπούσης, 1996, εκδόσεις Δ.Ε.Κ.ΠΟ.Τ.Α. Δήμου Δράμας
 Γράμμα στη Δόξα, έκδοση 1918–2008 ενενήντα χρόνια Δόξα Δράμας, Δράμα, 2009.
 «Δόξα Δράμας 1980–1995 τα δεκαπέντε χρόνια της Δόξας στην Α΄ Επαγγελματική κατηγορία», Θεόδωρος Μπουδακίδης, Δράμα, 2018.

References

External links
 [ Official website]
 Doxa Drama at UEFA
 http://www.stadia.gr/drama-f/drama-f-gr.html
 https://www.panoramio.com/photo/106218990

Association football clubs established in 1918
Football clubs in Eastern Macedonia and Thrace
1918 establishments in Greece
Drama, Greece
Gamma Ethniki clubs